Playrix Holding Ltd., also known as Playrix Entertainment and Playrix Games, is a developer of free-to-play mobile games behind titles such as Township, Fishdom, Homescapes, and Gardenscapes. The company was founded in 2004 by Dmitry Bukhman and Igor Bukhman in Vologda, Russia, and moved its headquarters to Dublin, Ireland in 2013.

Playrix was valued at $8 billion in 2021. As of 2022, Playrix was the fourth-biggest mobile game developer in the world in terms of revenue and employed 4,000 people across 100 cities, mainly in Eastern Europe, including 1500 in Russia and 1500 in Ukraine. In October 2022, the company said it was ceasing operations in Russia and Belarus due to the ongoing Russian invasion of Ukraine.

History 
Igor and Dmitry Bukhman started working on their first game in 2001 on a computer with a Pentium 100 processor. They released Discovera later that year, which was similar to the game Xonix. The brothers sеt its price at $15 and uploaded it to two hundred app catalogs. The game brought in $60 in its first month. Six months later, the Bukhman brothers released their second game, which brought their monthly revenue up to $200 and allowed them to buy a second computer. They released another game six months after that and started selling screensavers that they bought from programmers.

By 2004, Igor and Dmitry Bukhman had released three games and 30 screensavers, bringing their earnings to $10,000 a month. They founded Playrix, rented an office in Vologda, and hired ten employees. By the end of 2007, the company had released around 15 casual games and its first PC game, reaching a monthly revenue of $300,000.

In 2009, Playrix became interested in developing free-to-play games for mobile phones while continuing to create PC games. In 2012, the company launched its first game on Facebook — Township. In 2013, Township became the company’s first-ever game to be released on iOS and later on Android. Over the next seven years, the game would be downloaded about 250 million times.
The mobile games developer, Perfect Play Studio, with studios in Moscow mainly and Bryansk, was founded in 2009 as WebGames, then changed its name to Perfect Play in 2020. It is a part of Playrix. They first entered the market in 2010, with the name Webgames.

In April 2013, Playrix moved its headquarters to Dublin. The company started working remotely in 2015, and by 2016 it had more employees working remotely than at its central office.

At the end of April 2015, the company announced the release of its second free-to-play mobile game — Fishdom: Deep Dive. Playrix then released Gardenscapes (2016) and Homescapes (2017). The former brought the company $1.5 billion in revenue by the end of 2019. The company later released two more games — Wildscapes (2019) and Manor Matters (2020).

According to App Annie, in September 2016, the company became the highest-grossing mobile game developer in the CIS and Baltic states region, the second in Europe in terms of revenue, and ranked in the Top 20 biggest mobile game developers in the world. In August 2017, the company became the leading mobile game publisher in Europe based on revenue from Google Play and the App Store.

At the beginning of 2018, the Bukhman brothers considered selling the company but decided to invest in other video game companies instead. In 2018, Playrix acquired a 43% stake in Nexters, one of Europe's largest video game developers. In 2018 Playrix became the 9th highest-grossing game publisher globally on iOS and Android.

In 2019, Playrix made approximately $1.7 billion. About $100 million was spent buying shares in European game studios. In August 2019, Playrix invested in the Belarusian company Vizor Games. In October of the same year, Playrix bought the Ukrainian company Zagrava Games and integrated the Russian game developer Alawar Games into the company as well. That December, they acquired the Serbian company Eipix Entertainment.

In May 2020, Playrix acquired the Armenian studio Plexonic and the Croatian studio Cateia Games that June. As a result of this focus on acquisitions, the company grew at a rapid pace. As of 2020, more than 2,500 people were employed by Playrix in 25 offices around the world. In March of 2021, the company bought the Ukrainian studio Boolat Games.

In October 2022, Playrix announced it was closing its offices and development operations in Russia and Belarus, due to the ongoing Russian invasion of Ukraine. The company said it would relocate employees living in the affected countries to other regions.

Finances 
During the COVID-19 pandemic in 2020, Playrix reported an increase in downloads and profits. In response to the pandemic, in April 2020, Playrix paid each of their 2,100 employees an additional one-off payment of $650 to aid in financial support.

In 2020, according to App Annie, Gardenscapes and Fishdom were downloaded 190 million and 120 million times respectively. As a result, Playrix’s earnings from downloads and in-game purchases increased to $1.75 billion in just eight months. Profits from ads accounted for only 3% of the company’s total earnings. The number of monthly active players also increased to 180 million. As of 2021 the company's valuation was $8 billion. Playrix was the fourth-largest mobile game developer in the world based on revenue, earning $2.7 billion in 2021.

In April 2019, Igor and Dmitry Bukhman first appeared in the Bloomberg Billionaires Index. Their net worth was $1.4 billion each. According to the Bloomberg Billionaires Index, as of September 2020, each brother’s share was worth $3.9 billion.

Games

Current games

Former games 

 4 Elements
 4 Elements II 
 Atlantis Quest
 Rise of Atlantis
 Call of Atlantis
 The Path of Hercules
 Call of the Ages
 Royal Envoy
 Royal Envoy 2
 Royal Envoy 3: Campaign for the Crown
 Brickshooter Egypt 
 Around the World in 80 Days
 Fishdom
 Fishdom H2O: Hidden Odyssey
 Fishdom 2
 Fishdom: Spooky Splash
 Fishdom: Harvest Splash
 Fishdom: Frosty Splash
 Fishdom 3
 Aquascapes
 Fishdom: The Depths of Time
 Pocket Fishdom
 Gardenscapes
 Gardenscapes: Mansion Makeover
 Gardenscapes 2
 Farmscapes
 Barn Yarn

Criticism 
Playrix has been criticised for its use of deceptive or false advertisements on mobile advertisement platforms such as AdMob. Advertisements for many of their games like Fishdom, Gardenscapes, and Homescapes display gameplay that does not  represent the actual gameplay of the product in question. For example, Homescapes advertisements represent the gameplay as repairing a home by selecting the correct tool, while in reality, it is a match-3 game. In September 2020, the United Kingdom's Advertising Standards Authority ruled that two advertisements for Homescapes and Gardenscapes were misleading and "must not appear again in the form complained of".

Playrix was criticized by some employees after it removed discussion of the February 24, 2022 Russian invasion of Ukraine from Slack.  During the days following the invasion, the company deleted Slack posts by Ukrainian employees about the war.  The company shut down Slack channels March 3, 2022 after “outbursts of uncontrolled hatred between employees.” Co-founder Igor Bukhman defended the decision, and told Forbes “The only thing we’re asking of our employees during this crisis is that they keep our few official work channels solely for business communication.”

Hours after the invasion, Playrix put its approximately 1,500 Ukrainian-based staff on paid leave, and in the following days the company provided hotlines to help Ukrainian employees evacuate the country. By February 28th, Playrix gave its 4,000 employees, including the 1,500 in Russia, a bonus equivalent to a month’s salary.

On March 11, 2022, Playrix’s Ukraine-based subsidiary Hit Games donated $500,000 to the Ukrainian Red Cross.

In October 2022, Playrix announced it was closing its offices and development operations in Russia and Belarus due to the war in Ukraine.

References

External links 
 
 By the end of 2018, Playrix entered the top ten most profitable mobile companies in the world 
 Playrix scores another big match-3 mobile game hit with Homescapes

Video game companies of Ireland
Video game companies of Russia
Mobile game companies
Video game development companies
Companies based in Dublin (city)
Video game companies established in 2004
Russian companies established in 2004
False advertising
Privately held companies of Ireland